Emilia "Emilie" Maria Sara Sofia Uggla (24 February 1819 in Karlstad – 15 February 1855 in Upperud), was a Swedish noble classical concert pianist and concert singer.

Emilia Uggla was the daughter of nobleman and captain Carl Wilhelm Uggla and Sara Johanna Frykman.  She was the piano student of Olof Willman.

She made her debut in 1830, when she participated anonymously in a public concert in  Stockholm at the age of eleven.  In 1831, she held a public concert under her own name at Stora Börssalen in Stockholm.  1831–43, she toured Sweden, Norway and Denmark, and in 1838–40 in Finland and Russia, where she performed at the Imperial court of the Czar.

In 1843–47, she worked as a musical teacher.  In 1847, she married the noble Theodor Wilhelm Christian Uggla.

She died in childbirth.

The poet Johan Nybom dedicated the poem "Till en ung sångerska" ("To a Young Singer") to her.

References

 Emelie Uggla: Emilie Uggla (1819 - 1855) pianist & sångerska yrkesverksam 1831 - 1843
 Höjers musiklexikon
 Anteckningar om svenska qvinnor

Further reading 
 

1819 births
1855 deaths
19th-century Swedish women singers
Swedish classical pianists
Swedish women pianists
Swedish nobility
Deaths in childbirth
19th-century classical pianists
Women classical pianists
19th-century women pianists